The men's doubles tournament at the 1989 French Open was held from 29 May until 11 June 1989 on the outdoor clay courts at the Stade Roland Garros in Paris, France. Jim Grabb and Patrick McEnroe won the title, defeating Mansour Bahrami and Éric Winogradsky in the final.

Seeds

Draw

Finals

Top half

Section 1

Section 2

Bottom half

Section 3

Section 4

External links
 Association of Tennis Professionals (ATP) – main draw
1989 French Open – Men's draws and results at the International Tennis Federation

Men's Doubles
French Open by year – Men's doubles